This is a list of Ministers of Foreign Affairs of Turkey.

List 
The position of Ministers of Foreign Affairs of Turkey was established in 1920, during the Turkish War of Independence.

List of ministers of foreign affairs by time in office 

This is a list of Turkish ministers of foreign affairs by time in office. This is based on the difference between dates; if counted by number of calendar days all the figures would be one greater. Tevfik Rüştü Aras is the only person to have served as Minister of Foreign Affairs for more than ten years.

External links

Turkey
Ministers of Foreign Affairs
Foreign Affairs
Ministry of Foreign Affairs (Turkey)